Poradaha Union is a union parishad of Mirpur Upazila, in Kushtia District, Khulna Division of Bangladesh. There are 7 villages and 5 mouzas in the union.

References

External links
 

Unions of Khulna Division
Unions of Mirpur Upazila
Unions of Kushtia District